This is a list of the Swiss Hitparade number ones of 2019.

Swiss charts

Romandie charts

References
 Swiss No.1 Singles and Albums 2019
 Swiss Romandie Singles Chart

Number-one hits
Switzerland
2019